Electroluminescent Displays (ELDs) are a type of flat panel display created by sandwiching a layer of electroluminescent material such as GaAs between two layers of conductors. When current flows, the layer of material emits radiation in the form of visible light. Electroluminescence (EL) is an optical and electrical phenomenon where a material emits light in response to an electric current passed through it, or to a strong electric field. The term "electroluminescent display" describes displays that use neither LED nor OLED devices, that instead use traditional electroluminescent materials. Beneq is the only manufacturer of TFEL (Thin Film Electroluminescent Display) and TAESL displays, which are branded as LUMINEQ Displays. The structure of a TFEL is similar to that of a passive matrix LCD or OLED display, and TAESL displays are essentially transparent TEFL displays with transparent electrodes. TAESL displays can have a transparency of 80%. Both TEFL and TAESL displays use chip-on-glass technology, which mounts the display driver IC directly on one of the edges of the display. TAESL displays can be embedded onto glass sheets. Unlike LCDs, TFELs are much more rugged and can operate at temperatures from −60 to 105°C and unlike OLEDs, TFELs can operate for 100,000 hours without considerable burn-in, retaining about 85% of their initial brightness. The electroluminescent material is deposited using atomic layer deposition, which is a process that deposits one 1-atom thick layer at a time.

Mechanism
EL works by exciting atoms by passing an electric current through them, causing them to emit photons. By varying the material being excited, the colour of the light emitted can be changed. The actual ELD is constructed using flat, opaque electrode strips running parallel to each other, covered by a layer of electroluminescent material, followed by another layer of electrodes, running perpendicular to the bottom layer. This top layer must be transparent in order to let light escape. At each intersection, the material lights, creating a pixel.

Abbreviations
 AMEL Active Matrix Electroluminescence
 TFEL Thin Film Electroluminescence
 TDEL Thick Dielectric Electroluminescence

See also
Electroluminescence
Display examples
Thick-film dielectric electroluminescent technology

References

Electrical phenomena
Luminescence
Lighting
Display technology